Festucalex cinctus (girdled pipefish or orange-cheek pipefish) is a species of marine fish of the pipefish family Syngnathidae which is endemic to the waters off eastern Australia.

Identifying features
This species can be recognized by its broad head, slender snout, and leafy appendages on its dorsal ridges. Its colour varies from dark grey to orange-brown with pale bars along the back and an orange blotch on the lower gill cover, with occasional sightings of pale or black individuals.

Distribution and habitat
Festucalex cinctus is endemic to Australia, found off the coast of Queensland and New South Wales. F. cinctus has been recorded in small numbers in the open water near to pilings of piers in harbours.

Biology
Festucalex cinctus is demersal and is expected to feed on small crustaceans, similar to other pipefish. This species is ovoviviparous, with males carrying eggs and giving birth to live young. The males bear the fertilised eggs in a semi-enclosed pouch on the ventral side of the trunk, this pouch has distinct protective plates and its folds barely meet on the midline when it is full of eggs.

Conservation
Festucalex cinctus is a species of marine animal listed under the Australian Environment Protection and Biodiversity Conservation Act 1999 and which is protected under the New South Wales Fisheries Management Act. Specimens from the tropical part of its distribution, in northern Queensland and the Northern Territory, appear to be different from specimens in New South Wales and may represent a different species.

References

Further reading

Fishes of Australia
Government of Australia Department of the Environment and Energy

cinctus
Marine fish
Fish described in 1882